Hope Hines is the former Sports Director at WTVF in Nashville, Tennessee.

Career
Following his graduation with a Bachelor of Arts in journalism (A.B.J.) from the Henry W. Grady College of Journalism and Mass Communication at the University of Georgia, Hines joined WLAC-TV (now WTVF) of Nashville, Tennessee as Sports Director in 1971.

Beginning in 1975, Hines was Sports Director of KFMB-TV in San Diego, California. There, he also served as the play-by-play radio broadcaster for the NFL's San Diego Chargers. For a time, Hines worked for WWL-TV in New Orleans, and served as the television play-by-play announcer for the New Orleans Saints. Hines then spent a short stint in Charlotte, North Carolina, where he worked for Ted Turner at WRET (now WCNC-TV). Next, Hines worked in Baltimore, where he was the television play-by-play announcer for the Baltimore Colts, and anchorman for WMAR-TV.

In 1983, Hines returned to  WTVF in Nashville, Tennessee as Sports Director. He remained in this position until his retirement in July 2011.  His memoir, In Hines' Sight, was published shortly thereafter. For a time following his retirement from television, Hines produced a 60-second weekday sports commentary and profile segment for Nashville radio station WGFX 104.5 The Zone.

Accolades
Hines won six broadcast Emmy Awards. He was also named Best Sportscaster in the Southeast. He was named a recipient of the Silver Circle Award by the National Academy of Television Arts and Sciences for 25 Years of Distinguished Service to the Industry. In 2014, he was inducted into the Tennessee Sports Hall of Fame.

Private life
Hines and his wife Pat have three grown children and seven grandchildren.

References
Hines' bio on the Channel 5 ARCHIVED website

American broadcast news analysts
Baltimore Colts announcers
Television anchors from Nashville, Tennessee
National Football League announcers
New Orleans Saints announcers
San Diego Chargers announcers
University of Georgia alumni
Year of birth missing (living people)
Living people